Baur can refer to:

People
 A. C. Baur (1900–1931), American football player and stock broker
 Alfred Baur, Swiss collector of Asian art
 Eleonore Baur, only woman to participate in Munich Beer Hall Putsch
 Erwin Baur, German geneticist and botanist
 Esperanza Baur,  Mexican actress, 2nd wife of John Wayne
 Ferdinand Christian Baur, (1792–1860), German theologian and leader of the Tübingen school of theology
 Fred Baur, United States chemist and food storage technician
 Frances Joan Baur, better known as Nina Bara, American actress
 Gene Baur, activist, president and co-founder of Farm Sanctuary
 Georg Baur, German-American zoologist and paleontologist
 Goffredo Baur,  Italian cross country skier
 Gracia Baur, German singer
 Hans Baur, (1897–1993), Adolf Hitler's personal pilot
 Harry Baur, French actor
 Johann Wilhelm Baur, German engraver, etcher and miniature painter
 Karl Baur, Chief Test Pilot for the Messerschmitt Company
 Markus Baur, German handball player
 Michael Baur,  Austrian football player
 Mieke Andela-Baur, Dutch politician
 Patrick Baur, German tennis player
 Wolfgang Baur, U.S. games designer

Other
Baur River, river in India
Baur (village), a village in Pune district, India
 Baur H-AR, a fictitious heavy assault rifle in Battlefield 2142.
 Karosserie Baur, German coachmaker

See also
 Bauer (disambiguation)